Cheshmeh (also Romanized as Chashmeh; also known as Cheshma) is a village in Valdian Rural District, Ivughli District, Khoy County, West Azerbaijan Province, Iran. At the 2006 census, its population was 159, in 40 families.

References 

Populated places in Khoy County